Umar Wirahadikusumah (10 October 1924 – 21 March 2003) was an Indonesian politician and former army general, who served as the fourth Vice President of Indonesia, serving from 1983 until 1988. Previously, he was chair of the Audit Board of Indonesia from 1973 until 1983, and Chief of Staff of the Indonesian Army from 1969 until 1973. Born on 10 October 1924, to a noble Sundanese family. He was educated at the Europeesche Lagere School Tasikmalaya and Meer Uitgebreid Lager Onderwijs Pasundan. He entered the military in 1943, during the Japanese occupation. He would go on to serve in the Indonesian Army during and after the Indonesian National Revolution, seeing combat in the Madiun Affair and the PRRI rebellion.

After hearing about the kidnapping of six Generals and seeing unidentified troops occupying the Merdeka Square, Umar sent word to Kostrad Commander, Major General Suharto of the events which had just unfolded and requested his assistance. Umar accepted Suharto's decision to assume command of the Army and supported him in his efforts to crack down on the attempted coup, gaining great trust from Suharto. In 1967, Umar became Deputy Army Chief of Staff before finally becoming the Army Chief of Staff himself in 1969. In 1973, his active military career came to an end and he became the Chairman of the State Audit Board (BPK), a position which he would hold until 1973. In 1983, he was selected by Suharto to become vice president, a choice considered rather unexpected. As vice president, he combated corruption and held prayer services at the vice presidential palace. His term as vice president ended in March 1988 when he was replaced by Sudharmono. He died on 21 March 2003, due to heart and lung problems. His body was interred at the Kalibata Heroes Cemetery, Jakarta.

Early life and education 

Umar Wirahadikusumah was born in Situraja, Sumedang, West Java on 10 October 1924, to a noble family. His father, Raden Rangga Wirahadikusumah, was the Wedana of Ciawi, and Tasikmalaya. While his mother, Raden Ratnaringrum, was the daughter of Patih Demang Kartamenda in Bandung. His mother died when Umar was little, and he and his siblings were cared for by his grandmother, Nyi Raja Juwita, who at that time lived in Cicalengka. After his grandmother died, his father took him to Ciawi. While in Cicalengka, Umar entered kindergarten and elementary school at Hollandsch-Inlandsche School. He continued his education at the Europeesche Lagere School Tasikmalaya and Meer Uitgebreid Lager Onderwijs Pasundan, and he completed his education.

Military service

Pre-independence 

In 1943, with Indonesia now under Japanese Occupation, Umar enlisted with youth groups operating under the supervision of the Japanese Occupational Government. These youth groups provided some physical training which Umar undertook. This was followed in October 1944 by PETA, an auxiliary force consisting of Indonesian recruits which was intended to assist the Japanese in fighting the Allies. When Indonesia declared its Independence, Umar, like many other youths of similar age joined the TKR (The People's Security Soldiers), the forerunner to the TNI.

After the Indonesian National Revolution in which the fledgling nation successfully prevented the Dutch from reoccupying them, Umar served in the Army. Umar served for a long time in Kodam VI/Siliwangi (Siliwangi Division) which was stationed in his native province of West Java. He worked his way up the ranks, participating in a crackdown of the Communists in 1948 as well as fighting the PRRI rebellion in Sumatra. He was also at one time, the adjutant of AH Nasution when the latter held the position of Kodam VI/Siliwangi Commander.

Post-independence 

In 1959, Umar was trusted as the Commander of Kodam V/Jaya and he was now in charge of security around Jakarta. On the morning of 1 October 1965, six Generals were kidnapped from their houses. As the Commander of Kodam V/Jaya, Umar went around the city to check its security. After hearing about the kidnappings and seeing the unidentified troops occupying the Merdeka Square, Umar sent word to Kostrad Commander, Major General Suharto of the events which had just unfolded and requested his assistance.

Umar accepted Suharto's decision to assume command of the Army and supported him in his efforts to crack down on the attempted coup. Towards midday, Umar received a summon from President Sukarno who was suspiciously at Halim Perdanakusuma Airport, the place where the six Generals were taken. Suharto was worried that this was an attempt to get Umar to Halim and have him killed. Suharto firmly rejected the order. As Suharto retook control of the situation in Jakarta, Umar further consolidated it. He declared a curfew between 6 pm and 6 am and placed watch on all of the city's newspapers.

When blame for the incident was beginning to be put on the Indonesian Communist Party (PKI), Umar approved of the formation of Union of Action To Exterminate The 30 September Movement (KAP-GESTAPU), leading to the mass killing of an estimated half a million people in 1965–1966. Although he was not part of Suharto's inner circle, Umar won great trust from Suharto for the assistance and support given in putting down 30 September Movement. As Suharto began a rise which would see him end up as President of Indonesia, Umar's career also skyrocketed. In 1965, Suharto entrusted Umar to replace him as Commander of Kostrad. In 1967, Umar became Deputy Army Chief of Staff before finally becoming the Army Chief of Staff himself in 1969. In 1973, his active military career came to an end and he became the Chairman of the State Audit Board (BPK), a position which he would hold for 10 years. As Chairman of BPK, Umar was responsible for making sure that Government Departments, Ministries, and Agencies were using their money properly. During his tenure as Chairman of BPK, Umar made the grim assessment that not even one Government department was free from corruption.

Vice Presidency 

In March 1983, Umar reached the pinnacle of his career. Suharto, who had been elected for a 4th term as president by the People's Consultative Assembly (MPR) selected Umar to be his Vice President. This was considered to be a rather unexpected choice as Umar's stature in Indonesian politics paled in comparison compared to his two predecessors, Hamengkubuwono IX and Adam Malik. Despite being a low-key personality, Umar had a good reputation and was widely respected.

As Vice President, Umar became one of the very few in the Suharto regime who chose to combat corruption. As a religious man, Umar had hoped that religion can be used to turn corruptors to do the right deeds. Umar also conducted surprise inspections (sometimes incognito) to regional towns and villages to monitor how government policies were affecting the people. During his vice presidency, Umar also held prayer services at the Vice Presidential Palace. Umar's term as vice president ended in March 1988 when he was replaced by Sudharmono. Many were disappointed to see him not continue for a second term as vice president. It was a testament to his good reputation that Sudharmono wanted to be sure of Umar's acceptance to not continuing as vice president for another term.

Post-vice presidency 

In May 1998, on the eve of Suharto's fall, Umar, together with Sudharmono and Try Sutrisno visited Suharto at his residence to discuss possible options. Umar died on 21 March 2003 due to heart and lung problems at 7:53 pm. at the Central Army Hospital (RSPAD) Gatot Subroto. He was interred at the Kalibata Heroes Cemetery, Jakarta.

Personal life 

Umar married Karlinah Djaja Atmadja on 2 February 1957, with whom he had two daughters. Umar Wirahadikusumah was also the uncle of Agus Wirahadikusumah, a reformist military officer who himself became Commander of Kostrad.

Honours

National honours
The following is a list of awards awarded to Umar by the Indonesian government:
  Star of the Republic of Indonesia, 2nd Class (12 March 1983)
  Star of Mahaputera, 2nd Class (19 May 1973)
  Military Distinguished Service Star
  Guerrilla Star
  Star of Kartika Eka Paksi, 1st Class
  Star of Jalasena, 1st Class
  Star of Bhayangkara, 1st Class
  Star of Kartika Eka Paksi, 2nd Class
  Star of Jalasena, 2nd Class
  Star of Bhayangkara, 2nd Class
  Star of Kartika Eka Paksi, 3rd Class
  Indonesian Armed Forces "8 Years" Service Star
  Military Long Service Medal, 24 Years Service
  1st Independence War Medal
  2nd Independence War Medal
  Military Operational Service Medal for Madiun 1947
  Military Operational Service Medal for Angkatan Ratu Adil 1947
  Military Operational Service Medal for Jawa Barat 1959
  "Sapta Marga" Medal
  Northern Borneo Military Campaign Medal
  Medal for Combat Against Communists
  Military Instructor Service Medal

Foreign honours
The following is a list of awards awarded to Umar by foreign government:
  :
  Honorary Commander of the Order of Loyalty to the Crown of Malaysia (P.S.M.) (1972)
 :
  Grand Cross of the Order of Merit of the Federal Republic of Germany
 :
  Knight Grand Cross of the Order of Orange-Nassau
 :
  Second Rank of the Order of the People's Army with Golden Star
 :
  Commander of the Legion of Merit
 :
  First Class (Tong-il) of the Order of National Security Merit

Notes

Further reading

External links

Profile at TokohIndonesia 
Profile on pdat.co.id 

1924 births
2003 deaths
Chiefs of Staff of the Indonesian Army
Golkar politicians
Honorary Commanders of the Order of Loyalty to the Crown of Malaysia
Indonesian collaborators with Imperial Japan
Indonesian Muslims
Indonesian generals
Members of Pembela Tanah Air
People from Sumedang
Sundanese people
Vice presidents of Indonesia